The MMPL Kanpur was an Indian light four-seat aircraft, designed for service and agricultural work in the early 1960s. It is a rare example of an aircraft designed and built by a national air force for its own use.

Design and development
The Kanpur I was designed by an Indian Air Vice-Marshal and built in 132 days at the Indian Air Force Maintenance Command Development Centre at their Kanpur air base. A more powerful version, the Kanpur II, was intended for production as a military general-purpose and army observation machine, though serious consideration was also given to an agricultural role.  For this, the prototype Kanpur I was fitted with spray bars. The Kanpur I dates from about 1960 and the Kanpur II first flew in October 1961.

The four-seat Kanpur was a conventional single-engine, braced high-wing monoplane with a fixed conventional undercarriage. It had a steel structure, mostly fabric-covered. The constant chord wings were built around two spars and with 1° 26' of dihedral. They were braced on each side with a pair of V-struts from the two spars to the lower fuselage longerons. Metal-skinned split flaps and fixed leading edge slots were fitted.

The fully glazed cabin was under the wing, with the four occupants in two rows of side-by-side seats. The Kanpur pilot had standard blind flying instrumentation and a STR-9X radio. The air-cooled engine, a flat four in the Kanpur I and a flat six in the Kanpur II, drove a two-blade propeller. The Kanpur's main wheels were mounted on cantilever, faired legs attached to the lower fuselage through liquid shock absorbers. There was a small tailwheel at the extreme tail, where the tailplane was placed on the upper fuselage.  The elevator had a cut-out for the rounded rudder which extended to the keel, hung on a fin smoothly merged into the upper fuselage.

Variants
Kanpur I: Prototype, with a four-cylinder,  Lycoming air-cooled horizontally opposed engine.

Kanpur II: Intended for production with a six-cylinder,  Lycoming air-cooled horizontally opposed engine. It was  longer, a little heavier on take-off and had a maximum speed  greater.

Specifications (Kanpur II)

References

1960s Indian aircraft